Avgustovka may refer to:

Avgustovka, Saratov Oblast
Avgustovka, Samara Oblast